The Chilton Post Office is a historic post office located at 57 E. Main St. in Chilton, Wisconsin, United States. The post office was built in 1938 and designed in the Georgian Revival style. The red brick building has a metal hip roof in the front and a flat roof in the back. The front entrance has a pair of bronze aluminum doors with white trim topped by a metal eagle. A Works Progress Administration mural by Charles Winstanley Thwaites, titled "Threshing Barley", is painted on a wall in the lobby.

The post office was added to the National Register of Historic Places on October 24, 2000.

References

Buildings and structures in Calumet County, Wisconsin
Colonial Revival architecture in Wisconsin
Government buildings completed in 1938
Post office buildings on the National Register of Historic Places in Wisconsin
National Register of Historic Places in Calumet County, Wisconsin